The Tahlil, also spelled Tahleel, is a form of dhikr that involves the praising of God in Islam by saying , meaning "There is none worthy of worship except Allah".

Etymology
The word Tahlil is the verbal noun of the form 2 verb Hallala which literally means '"to praise" or "to acclaim".

History
Traditionally, the utterance of the sentence is part of the shahada performed by somebody converting to Islam. Later on, it became a tradition practiced as a ritual of Sufism during events like the remembering of a dead Muslim. Performing Tahlil to remember the dead is considered bidʻah by Salafi Muslims, and the practice itself is known specifically as niayah.

In Indonesia and Malaysia, ritualized repetitive chanting of the tahlil is part of the tradition of kenduri, which is common during death rituals. The custom is known locally as majlis tahlil "assembly to perform prayers". This practice is more common among Muslims that are followers of the traditionalist Nahdlatul Ulama movement.

Hadith
Narrated by Abu Huraira: The Messenger of Allah said, "He who utters a hundred times in a day these words: `La ilaha illallahu, wahdahu la sharika lahu, lahul-mulku wa lahul-hamdu, wa Huwa `ala kulli sha'in Qadir (there is nobody worthy of worship except Allah. He is One and He has no partner with Him; His is the sovereignty and His is the praise, and He is Omnipotent),' he will have a reward equivalent to that for emancipating ten slaves, a hundred good deeds will be recorded to his credit, hundred of his sins will be blotted out from his scroll, and he will be safeguarded against the devil on that day till the evening; and no one will exceed him in doing more excellent good deeds except someone who has recited these words more often than him

Malik ibn Anas reported from Talha ibn Ubaydullah ibn Kariz that Muhammad said, "The best dua is dua on the day of Arafa, and the best thing that I and the Prophets before me have said is "There is nothing worshipped but Allah, alone without any partner" (La ilaha illa'llah, wahdahu la sharika lah)"

See also

Shahada
Tasbih
Tahmid
Takbir
Tasmiyah
Tawhid
Salawat
Peace be upon him
Glossary of Islam
Quran
Anthem of the Chechen Republic of Ichkeria, which repeats the tahlil throughout

References

Islamic terminology
Arabic words and phrases